Seyfabad (also Romanized as Seyfābād; also known as Safiābād and Seyfiabad) is a village in Zanjanrud-e Pain Rural District, Zanjanrud District, Zanjan County, Zanjan Province, Iran. At the 2006 census, its population was 141, in 28 families.

References 

Populated places in Zanjan County